Preseault v. United States (U.S. Ct. of Appeals, Federal Circuit 1996) was a notable US court case involving Rail to Trails programs in the state of Vermont.  The case involved the scope of the government’s ownership in public interests it had abandoned years prior to its decision to reuse the property for another task without considering the land-owners rights.

Background

Beginning in the 1980s the US government began the Rail to Trails program across the nation to alter defunct railroad lines into public trails for recreational use.  Since the rise of railroad efficiency and its conglomeration, many lines had become defunct and uneconomical.  In an effort to promote conservation, the government enacted a policy that would turn these lines into recreational trails for hiking, biking, or possibly other activities.

Preseault owned the land that a defunct Vermont rail line formerly operated.  The railroad had an easement on Preseault’s land to operate the line.  In 1970 the rail line became completely unoperated and was left defunct until 1975 when the rail track was dismantled leaving the path only.  However the railroad never officially filed an abandonment order.

The railroad company had bought the land under a fee simple contract, meaning they legally owned the land.  However it was an incorrect filing and for all intents and purposes the agreement was treated as an easement and recognized as such by all parties.  Preseault bought the land aware that there was an easement on the land, but believed said easement had been abandoned since the track was dismantled and removed. 

When the Rails to trails program was initiated, the Interstate Commerce Commission (ICC) gained ownership of the line and began refitting the line as a recreational trail without the permission of Preseault.  The ICC, along with the state, believed they still had rights of use under their easement agreement and that using the trail for a new recreational program was not in violation of the easement’s protocol.  A trail was built and hikers and bicyclists began transgressing on Preseault’s property.  Preseault filed a complaint with the ICC stating that his permission was never attained and that he was never compensated.  The ICC refused, stating that the easement of the past railroad line had carried over to its ownership. 

Preseault therefore brought the case, Preseault vs. ICC (1990), to the US Supreme Court in 1990, arguing that the Rails to Trails program was unconstitutional and was ruled against.  Following this loss, Preseault sued the federal government and brought his case, Preseault vs. United States, to the Appellate Court for further review that was finally decided in 1996.

Case
The court first considered if the rights to use the land were under an easement contract, which is how it was effectively used, or if it was under a fee simple, as it nominally was.  In this regard the court found that the railroad had in fact procured an easement and not a fee simple.  The court then deliberated on the nature of the easement.

Easements can be passed from one title holder to another.  However, it generally must follow certain conditions such as: 
Operations must continue and be unabandoned
The easement is for a particular purpose and must remain operable only for this same purpose. 

On both of these conditions the court deliberated and made findings crucial to the case.  One, they found that when the railroad dismantled the track in 1975, they had effectively abandoned their right of easement, regardless of having not filed an abandonment order.  Therefore any easement pertaining to the use of this rail track became void.

Secondly the function of the land in question was being used for a different purpose, and therefore could certainly not hold up under easement terms.  Fee simple terms would have permitted this, but the court had already determined that the terms of the contract were certainly under an easement.

Decision
The court found that Preseault’s 5th Amendment Rights, specifically his right of just compensation, had been violated since the land in question was surely his legal property.  The easement had been abandoned by the railroad when it dismantled track and thus it never had the legal right to turn easement rights over to the ICC. 

The Federal Government was required to pay Preseault compensation for the use of the land and seek his explicit permission to use the land under a new easement contract specific to a recreational trail.

Significance
This case greatly reinforces 5th Amendment rights of citizens and bars the government from transferring easements of land for different purposes without a new contract being created with the property owner.  It also establishes that the intent of a contract, such as between an easement and a fee simple, is significant and may help to alter the findings of a case.  The filing in this instance was incorrectly done and for all intents and purposes was treated as an easement.

References

Interstate Commerce Commission litigation
United States administrative case law
Eminent domain